Volleyball at the 2012 Summer Paralympics was held from 30 August to 8 September at the ExCeL Exhibition Centre in London. Two sitting volleyball team events were held, one for men and one for women.

In the men's sitting event, Iran were the defending champions. Bosnia and Herzegovina and Iran were the finalists in 2000, 2004 and 2008, with Iran winning in 2000 and 2008 and Bosnia and Herzegovina in 2004. These two countries met once more in the final in Beijing, with Iran emerging victorious by 3–0. Egypt finished fourth in Beijing, beaten 2–3 by Russia, who took bronze. Bosnia and Herzegovina's men's team won the gold in 2012, beating Iran 3-1, although Iran had also won by 3-1 against them in the group stage.

The London Games marked the third time the women's sitting event was held. China were the defending champions. The Netherlands took silver, and the United States bronze, in 2004. In Beijing, China was again victorious, while the US and the Netherlands switched places to ascend the podium with silver and bronze, respectively.

This was the third Summer Paralympic Games without standing volleyball events, which had been included from the introduction of volleyball in 1976 (when sitting volleyball was a demonstration event) through 2000.

Medalists

Classification
In sitting volleyball there are two categories of classification: disabled and minimal disability.  A maximum of one minimally disabled player may be on the court for each team at any one time.

A part of the player's body between the buttocks and the shoulders must be in contact with the court when playing or attempting to play the ball.

Qualification
There were 18 teams, 10 men's teams and 8 women's teams, taking part. Each country can enter one team per tournament.

Men's tournament

Preliminary round

Group A

Group B

Final round

Women's tournament

Preliminary round

Group A

Group B

Final round

References

External links
Official page for volleyball competition 

 
2012
2012 Summer Paralympics events
Paralympics
International volleyball competitions hosted by the United Kingdom